George Gaiser (born May 9, 1945) is a former American football tackle and guard. He played for the Denver Broncos in 1968.

References

1945 births
Living people
American football tackles
American football guards
SMU Mustangs football players
Denver Broncos players